Pelham station is a commuter rail stop on the Metro-North Railroad's New Haven Line, located in Pelham, New York. The station is one mile west of the New Haven Line's junction of the Northeast Corridor, and is located just east of the end of third rail power and start of overhead catenary power.

History
The Pelham station was built in 1893 by the New York, New Haven, and Hartford Railroad. As with all New Haven Line stations in Westchester County, the station became a Penn Central station upon acquisition by Penn Central in 1969, and eventually became part of the MTA's Metro-North Railroad. As of August 2006, weekday commuter ridership was 2,284, and there are 356 parking spots.

Station layout
The station has two high-level side platforms, each 10 cars long.

The Pelham station has the lowest number of parking spaces among all New Haven Line stations in Westchester County. The two main parking lots consist of the one at the given address along Pelhamwood Avenue along the New York City-bound platforms, and along First Street along the New Haven-bound platforms that can be entered across from the intersection with Corlies Avenue. Both parking lots are between Wolf's Lane and Highbrook Avenue. Street-side parking is available along First Street west of the parking lot entrance across from Nyac Avenue.

References

External links

1999 Bill Kessler Photo (Existing Railroad Stations in Westchester County, New York)
 Wolfs Lane entrance from Google Maps Street View

Pelham, New York
Metro-North Railroad stations in New York (state)
Stations along New York, New Haven and Hartford Railroad lines
Railway stations in the United States opened in 1893
Railway stations in Westchester County, New York
1893 establishments in New York (state)